Duydukh-e Olya (also Romanized as Dūydūkh-e ‘Olyā and Dūydokh-e ‘Olyā; also known as Dowydokh-e Bālā and Duydokh) is a village in Jargalan Rural District, Raz and Jargalan District, Bojnord County, North Khorasan Province, Iran. At the 2006 census, its population was 2,032, in 405 families.

References 

Populated places in Bojnord County